Jemimah (also written Jemima) was the oldest of the three beautiful daughters of Job, named in the Bible as given to him in the later part of his life, after God made Job prosperous again.  Jemimah's sisters are named as Keziah and Keren-Happuch. Job's sons, in contrast, are not named.

Jemimah, along with her sisters, was described as the most beautiful women in the land.  Also, unusually and in common with her sisters, Jemimah was granted an inheritance by her father, with her brothers as might have been expected.  Apart from these brief references at the end of the Book of Job, Jemimah is not mentioned elsewhere in the Bible.

The name Jemimah means "dove".

In Job 42:14 (ESV):

And he called the name of the first daughter Jemimah, and the name of the second Keziah, and the name of the third Keren-happuch

References

Book of Job people
Job (biblical figure)
Women in the Hebrew Bible